Sharon Day is the former United States Ambassador to Costa Rica. She previously served as the co-chairwoman of the Republican National Committee. She resigned on January 19, 2021.

Career 
Day owned an insurance company in Indianapolis with her husband. They sold the company, which had 156 employees, in the early 1990s and retired to South Florida.

Day has served on different Republican Party committees on the local, state, and national level since the 1990s. Day became a precinct committeeman in 1994, state Republican committeeman for Broward County in 1996, national committeewoman representing Florida in 2004, and national party secretary in 2009. She lost a bid for national party chair in 2010 when Jim Greer resigned. She has served as national party co-chair since 2011 and has been re-elected into 2015.

Personal life 
Day resided in the Galt Mile neighborhood in Fort Lauderdale, Florida. She has been a lifelong Republican. She was married to Larry Day, whom she built the insurance company with. They have two children. Larry died in 2012.

References

External links
 US Ambassador biography
 Sharon Day at ballotpedia.org
 Sharon Day at ourcampaigns.com

1950s births
Living people
21st-century American women
Year of birth missing (living people)
Ambassadors of the United States to Costa Rica
American women ambassadors
Florida Republicans
American women diplomats